Confessions of Crime is an American reality series that aired on Lifetime in 1991.

Overview
The series used police interrogation tapes and reenactments to reconstruct violent crimes, mostly among women. Series host Theresa Saldana was herself the victim of a stabbing by an obsessed fan in 1982.

References

1991 American television series debuts
1991 American television series endings
1990s American reality television series
Lifetime (TV network) original programming
Television series featuring reenactments
English-language television shows